This is a list of Japanese football transfers in both the winter and summer transfer windows of 2023 by club.

J1 League

J2 League

J3 League

Japan Football League

References 

2022-23
Transfers
Japan